Tsvetelin Lukov Chunchukov (born 26 December 1994) is a Bulgarian professional footballer who plays as a forward for Liga II side CSA Steaua București.

Career

Early career
Born in Pazardzhik, Chunchukov began playing football for local side Benkovski. On 2 May 2010, at the age of 15 years and 4 months, he made his debut as a second-half substitute against Germanea Sapareva Banya in a game of the South-West V AFG, the third level of Bulgarian football. On 12 May, he scored his first goal in a 1–1 home draw against Malesh Mikrevo.

In 2011, Chunchukov was spotted by a Levski Sofia scout and joined the club as an academy player.

Botev Plovdiv
On 5 April 2013, Chunchukov joined Botev Plovdiv, signing first professional contract in his career. He signed a three-year deal with the club.

Chunchukov made his debut for the first team of Botev Plovdiv during season 2014-15. He came on as a substitute in the first qualifying round of the 2014–15 UEFA Europa League against underdogs A.C. Libertas. Botev Plovdiv won this match 4-0. Chunchukov scored his first goal for Botev Plovdiv on 17 July 2014 during the 2:1 win against St. Pölten in the next round of Europa League. Three days after that Chunchukov was at the starting lineup against Lokomotiv Sofia and he made a debut in A Grupa. Botev Plovdiv won this game with 1:0 after a goal from a penalty kick which has given after a fault against Chunchukov.

Chunchukov scored his first goal in A Grupa on 17 August 2014. He opened the scoring in an away game against Levski Sofia but unfortunately Botev Plovdiv lost the match with 2:1.

On 27 September Chunchukov scored a magnificent goal, provided an assist for the goal of Ivan Tsvetkov and was among the best players on the pitch during the derby match against Lokomotiv Plovdiv. Botev Plovdiv achieved a 2-0 home win.

Chunchukov scored his third goal in A Grupa on 19 October but Lokomotiv Sofia defeated Botev Plovdiv 3-1.

After a seven-game goal drought, Chunchukov scored again on 7 December 2014 against PFC Haskovo.

Chunchukov scored again in the next round of A Grupa which was the first official game for 2015. Tsvetelin netted the opening goal and assisted for the last goal during the 3-0 home win over PFC Marek Dupnitsa. In the next round Chunchukov played during the 2-0 win over the local rivals Lokomotiv Plovdiv, missed the game with CSKA Sofia due to a ban, and on 22 March he was again in the starting lineup for 0-0 draw with Ludogorets Razgrad.

On 18 April Chunchukov came on as a substitute and made an assist during the 1-1 draw with Beroe Stara Zagora. A month later, on 23 May, he made an assist again versus the same team. Despite his efforts this time Botev Plovdiv was defeated with 1-2 during the visit to Beroe Stara Zagora.

At the end of the season, Chunchukov was announced as the A Group Youth Player of the Year for his contributions to the club. His teammate Milen Gamakov was named runner-up in the same contest.

Rakovski (loan)
Tsvetelin Chunchukov was loaned by Botev Plovdiv to Rakovski and spent 2013-14 season in the B Group. He appeared in 16 matches for the club, scoring goals against Bansko and Dobrudzha Dobrich, the latter of which came in a match for the Bulgarian Cup.

Ludogorets
On 23 June 2015, Chunchukov was transferred from Botev Plovdiv to Ludogorets Razgrad for an undisclosed fee, considered to be in the range of 175 000 EUR, as reported by several Bulgarian media outlets. On 1 July Chunchukov scored the only goal for his new team in a 1-0 friendly win against Romanian club Universitatea Craiova.

Unfortunately, on 4 October 2016, Chunchukov broke his left leg foot during a training session of the Bulgaria U21 team and as a result, he was ruled out from the squad for several months. After recovery, he spent most of his playing time at Ludogorets's reserve squad in the Bulgarian Second League.
He was released from the club on 7 June 2017.

Cherno More
On 19 June 2017 he signed with Cherno More Varna. On 15 July, he made his debut in a 1–0 home win over Vitosha Bistritsa. He scored his first goal on 21 July in a 4–0 away win over Vereya. On 14 December 2017, his contract was terminated by mutual consent.

Slavia Sofia
On 28 December 2017, Chunchukov signed with Slavia Sofia.

International career
Chunchukov made his debut for Bulgaria U21 in the 2-2 draw with Estonia U21 on 3 September 2014, contributing with a goal. On 31 March 2015 he played  during the first half of the 1-3 away defeat from Wales U21.

On 25 March 2016 Chunchukov came on as a substitute during the goalless draw with Wales U21.

He made his debut for the senior national team on 7 June 2019 in a Euro 2020 qualifier against the Czech Republic, as an 82nd-minute substitute for Todor Nedelev.

Personal life
In an interview for Botev Plovdiv's club channel Chunchukov stated that he was encouraged to play football by his grandfather and has no favorite foreign football club.

Career statistics

Honours

Club
Ludogorets Razgrad
 Bulgarian First League (2): 2015–16, 2016–17

Slavia Sofia
 Bulgarian Cup (1): 2017–18

Individual 

 A Group Young Player of the Year: 2014–15

References

External links
 
 
 

1994 births
Living people
Sportspeople from Pazardzhik
Bulgarian footballers
Bulgaria under-21 international footballers
Bulgaria international footballers
Association football forwards
First Professional Football League (Bulgaria) players
Second Professional Football League (Bulgaria) players
Botev Plovdiv players
PFC Ludogorets Razgrad II players
PFC Ludogorets Razgrad players
PFC Cherno More Varna players
PFC Slavia Sofia players
Liga I players
LPS HD Clinceni players
Sepsi OSK Sfântu Gheorghe players
AFC Chindia Târgoviște players
Liga II players
CSA Steaua București footballers
Bulgarian expatriate footballers
Bulgarian expatriate sportspeople in Romania
Expatriate footballers in Romania